German submarine U-166 was a Type IXC U-boat of Nazi Germany's Kriegsmarine during World War II. The submarine was laid down on 6 December 1940 at the Seebeckwerft (part of Deutsche Schiff- und Maschinenbau AG, Deschimag) at Wesermünde (modern Bremerhaven) as yard number 705, launched on 1 November 1941, and commissioned on 23 March 1942 under the command of Oberleutnant zur See Hans-Günther Kuhlmann. After training with the 4th U-boat Flotilla, U-166 was transferred to the 10th U-boat Flotilla for front-line service on 1 June 1942. The U-boat sailed on only two war patrols and sank four ships totalling . She was sunk on 30 July 1942 in the Gulf of Mexico.

Design
German Type IXC submarines were slightly larger than the original Type IXBs. U-166 had a displacement of  when at the surface and  while submerged. She had two shafts and two  propellers.

U-166 was fitted with six  torpedo tubes (four fitted at the bow and two at the stern), 22 torpedoes, one  SK C/32 naval gun, 180 rounds, and a  SK C/30, as well as a  C/30 antiaircraft gun. The boat had a complement of 49.

Service history

First patrol
U-166 first sailed from Kiel to Kristiansand, Norway, on 30–31 May 1942. The U-boat sailed on her first combat patrol, from Kristiansand on 1 June 1942, around the British Isles, and arrived at Lorient, France, 10 days later.

Second patrol
U-166 departed from Lorient on 17 June 1942, sailed across the Atlantic and into the Gulf of Mexico

Fate
PC-566 immediately attacked, making her approach vector outside the view of U-166s periscope, and claimed to have sunk the U-boat with depth charges. Upon returning to port with the survivors of Robert E. Lee, the Navy did not believe the account provided by PC-566s skipper LCDR Herbert G. Claudius, USNR. Claudius' tactics were criticized, resulting in his reprimand and removal from seagoing command.

The aircraft attacked and it appeared that the U-boat was hit in the attack. U-166 was reported missing in action on 30 July 1942, which coincided with the American aircraft's attack on "a U-Boat", leading to the aircraft being credited with the sinking of U-166, with the loss of all 52 crew members. Both aircraft crewmen were decorated for the action.

Wreckage located in 2001

An archaeological survey of the seafloor prior to construction of a natural gas pipeline led to the discoveries by C & C Marine archaeologists Robert A. Church and Daniel J. Warren. The sonar contacts consisted of two large sections lying roughly 500 ft apart at either end of a debris field that indicated the presence of a U-boat. Petroleum companies operating in the Gulf of Mexico's outer continental shelf are required to provide sonar data in areas that have archaeological potential. BP and Shell sponsored additional fieldwork to record detailed images, including a gun on the deck aft of the submarine's conning tower.

Charles "C.J." Christ, from Houma, spent most of his life searching for U-166 and was involved in the final identification of the U-boat.

It is protected against any future attempts to salvage it.

Oceanographer and National Geographic Explorer-in-Residence Robert Ballard explored and mapped the wreck in the summer of 2014 with remotely operated vehicles, where they noticed that the submarine's bow had been blown off and found rested on the seafloor 100 feet away from the main hull. They determined that the bow of the submarine was destroyed, apparently by a depth charge that landed on the forward deck, exploded, and caused an internal detonation of the submarine's own torpedoes, which broke off the bow. If so, this would be one of the few successful submarine kills caused by direct contact from a depth charge, as typical attacks relied upon depth charges exploding a short distance away to inflict repeated hydraulic shocks that would eventually crack a submarine's pressure hull.

Initial credit for the sinking of U-166 had been given to a Grumman G-44 Widgeon, but the position of the wreck made it clear that this should have gone to the submarine chaser PC-566. 
On 16 December 2014, the Secretary of the Navy Ray Mabus posthumously awarded the captain of PC-566, then-LCDR Herbert G. Claudius, USNR (later CAPT USN), the Legion of Merit with a Combat "V" device for heroism in battle and credited him with the sinking of the U-boat. "Seventy years later, we now know that [Claudius's] report after the action was absolutely correct," he said. "[Claudius's ship] did sink that U-boat, and it's never too late to set the record straight."

Results of a study released in February 2019 showed that the wreck of U-166 was being badly damaged because of the 2010 Deepwater Horizon oil spill. Seabed bacteria, feeding on the oil, were causing the damage.

Summary of raiding history

Note
 One of the foremost authorities on the subject is Charles "C.J." Christ, from Houma, who spent most of his life searching for U-166. His personal account about his search and the final locating and identification of the U-boat can be found in a local newspaper, The Houma Courier: C.J. Christ "WAR IN THE GULF: German submarine, U-166, found in the Gulf of Mexico" (The article can be found online as reprint by another local newspaper, The Daily Comet).

References

External links

 The Story of U-166: The Gulf of Mexico's Lost U-Boat
 Photograph and sonar image of the Robert E. Lee
 The U-166 - NOAA
 WWII German UBoats
 WWII Gulf of Mexico Shipwreck Survey Expedition 2004 - NOAA

German Type IX submarines
U-boats commissioned in 1942
U-boats sunk in 1942
World War II submarines of Germany
1941 ships
Shipwrecks in the Gulf of Mexico
World War II shipwrecks in the Gulf of Mexico
Ships built in Bremen (state)
U-boats sunk by US warships
U-boats sunk by depth charges
Ships lost with all hands
Maritime incidents in July 1942
Shipwrecks on the National Register of Historic Places
World War II on the National Register of Historic Places
2001 archaeological discoveries